Maurizio Oioli (born 9 July 1981, Domodossola) is an Italian skeleton racer who competed since 2002. At the 2006 Winter Olympics in Turin, he finished 12th in the men's skeleton event.

Oioli also finished 26th in the men's skeleton event at the 2005 FIBT World Championships in Calgary.

References
 2006 men's skeleton results
 FIBT profile
 Italian team profile for the 2006 Winter Olympics 
 Skeletonsport.com profile

External links
 

1981 births
Italian male skeleton racers
Living people
People from Domodossola
Skeleton racers at the 2006 Winter Olympics
Skeleton racers at the 2014 Winter Olympics
Olympic skeleton racers of Italy
Sportspeople from the Province of Verbano-Cusio-Ossola
20th-century Italian people
21st-century Italian people